Andrew Fyfe was a Scottish amateur footballer who played as a centre forward in the Scottish League for Queen's Park.

Personal life 
Fyfe served as a bombardier in the Royal Garrison Artillery during the First World War. He was mentioned in dispatches.

References

1898 births
Scottish footballers
Scottish Football League players
British Army personnel of World War I
Royal Garrison Artillery soldiers
Association football forwards
Queen's Park F.C. players
Date of death missing
People from Dennistoun
Military personnel from Glasgow